CMRF35-like molecule 1, also known as CD300lf, is a protein that in humans is encoded by the CD300LF gene. CD300lf belongs to the protein family of CD300. CD300lf is a membrane glycoprotein that contains an immunoglobulin domain and is expressed by myeloid and mast cells of humans and other mammals. The protein functions in immunoregulation but might also have a role in norovirus infections.

CD300lf and noroviruses 
CD300lf has been shown to function as the primary receptor for murine norovirus in mice, Human norovirus does not use the same receptor in viral entry. Human and murine CD300lf proteins have about 59% identity in their immunoglobulin domains, with most of that variation occurring in parts of the protein called CDR3 and the CC’loop. Murine norovirus binds to a cleft between these domains. The differences between murine and human CD300lf contribute to murine norovirus host species restriction, as incorporating murine CD300lf into human cells makes them susceptible to infection by the murine virus.

References

Further reading

External links